The Mid-South Basketball Association (MSBA) was a minor league men's basketball circuit that began play in the spring of 2019 with teams in Kentucky, Missouri, and Tennessee. The league has two seasons (spring and fall) per calendar year.

History
The inaugural spring season of 2019 began with seven member teams. In addition two teams (Cincinnati Movement, Louisville Diesel) played as affiliates with their games counting in the regular season standings was played with seven teams. Following a 10-game regular season the St. Louis Trotters defeated Tennessee Sting to win the first MSBA championship. It was a third league title for the Trotters who won championships in the Independent Basketball Association in Spring 2015 and Spring 2017.

MSBA sat out 2020 due to the COVID-19 pandemic. On February 13, 2021 the MSBA and its teams merged with the Pro Basketball Association. Less than two months later four of the original MSBA teams left the PBA to form the New Nation Basketball Association.

Teams

Former teams 
 Henderson Stars (2019)
Hoptown Hustlas (2019)
Kentucky Flash (2019) - removed after Fall regular season after failing to fulfill obligations to league
Kentucky Warriors (2019)
 Music City Kings (2019) - removed after failing to fulfill obligations to league
Smoky Mountain Black Bears (2019) - team folded
 Southeast Kentucky Soldiers (2019) - dismissed by the league after four games

Champions

References

External links 
 

Basketball leagues in the United States
Basketball in Kentucky
Basketball in Missouri
Basketball in Tennessee